Norfolk Island Airlines Limited was a regional airline based on Norfolk Island which operated services to the Australian mainland from Norfolk and Lord Howe Islands.

The airline commenced operations in 1973 with a Beech Baron on services from Norfolk Island Airport to Brisbane. A Beech King Air 200 was acquired by the airline in 1975 and services began from Lord Howe Island Airport in 1976.

In 1988 it was renamed to Norfolk Airlines and operated Beech Queen Air and BN Islander and ceased the operations in 1991.

Norfolk Island Airlines (2017)

A later airline of the same name briefly existed during 2017 and 2018, linking Norfolk with Brisbane and even more briefly Auckland.

The airline used Nauru Airlines aircraft.

See also
 List of defunct airlines of Australia
 Aviation in Australia

References 

Defunct airlines of Norfolk Island
Airlines established in 1973
Organisations based in Norfolk Island
Companies based in Norfolk Island
Australian companies established in 1973